Maglaj is a town and municipality located in the Zenica-Doboj Canton of the Federation of Bosnia and Herzegovina, an entity of Bosnia and Herzegovina. It has a population of 6,438, with 34,980 inhabitants in the municipality.

Population

Ethnic composition

Geography
The town is situated in the northern part of Bosnia and Herzegovina and is situated in territory where Bosniaks presently form a large majority. The old Maglaj, like numerous other cities in Bosnia and Herzegovina, has an old town with mosques, traditional houses dating back from the Ottoman Empire, and a fortress that stands as a symbol of Maglaj. The new part of Maglaj, situated on the West side of the river Bosna, is made up of modern architecture that was started in the 1950s, and became massively developed until 1991.

The Bosna flows through Maglaj on its way north to the Sava river on the border between Bosnia and Herzegovina and Croatia. Before the Bosnian War, the Bosna river was heavily polluted due to heavy industrial activity at the nearby Natron paper and pulp factory, as well as steel and wood industry factories in the southern cities of Zenica and Zavidovići respectively. Nowadays, the river has become cleaner due to decreased industrial activity at those plants and higher environmental standards.

Demographics

The city, as well as the entire Maglaj municipality, have been subject to a large demographic population shift.  Close to all of its pre-war Christian inhabitants, i.e. Orthodox Serbs and Catholic Croats, who made up the majority of the pre-war municipality population, no longer reside in the Maglaj municipality. 

The Orthodox population has largely settled in the Doboj and Modriča regions of the Republika Srpska, while the Catholic population has settled in the nearby municipality of Žepče, an enclave inhabited largely by Croats. A significant number of former Croat inhabitants have also settled in Croatia's capital Zagreb. 

Due to the severe fighting around Maglaj throughout the Bosnian War, and the catastrophic conditions it was exposed to, numerous Bosniaks have departed the region as well.

Pre-war Maglaj was unique because over one third of its married couples were made up of mixed ethnic groups. As a result of this, a great number of these Maglaj inhabitants felt welcome by none of the three warring ethnic groups, and tried to settle abroad. Consequentially, Maglaj residents have dispersed.

History
Maglaj originated in the 14th century. The river Bosna goes through this town.

From 1929 to 1941, Maglaj was part of the Vrbas Banovina of the Kingdom of Yugoslavia.

The city endured a long siege by Bosnian Serbs forces between 1993 and 1994 during the Bosnian War, when the area was the scene of heavy fighting and the population had to be supplied by airdrops.

The last flooding occurred on May 16, 2014. Although little floods occur every year, the 2014 flood was major, people lost their homes and belongings.

Notable people
Admir Hasančić, football player
Alma Čardžić, singer, representative of Bosnia and Herzegovina in the Eurovision Song Contest in 1994 and 1997
Bahrudin Čengić, film director and screenwriter
Šemsa Suljaković, singer
Edhem Mulabdić, writer
Ruža Tomašić, politician and European Parliament member

Twin towns – sister cities

Maglaj is twinned with:
 Çubuk, Turkey

References

External links

Tragovima bosanskog kraljevstva - Tourist route for medieval Bosnia (English)
Trail of the Bosnian Kingdom - Cultural Tourism in Tesanj

 
Populated places in Maglaj